Manuel Jorge da Silva Cruz (born 16 October 1972), known as Tulipa, is a Portuguese retired footballer who played as a midfielder, currently manager of F.C. Vizela.

Playing career
Born in Vila Nova de Gaia, Porto metropolitan area, Tulipa spent much of his youth at FC Porto but never made a first-team appearance. He totalled 183 games and 25 goals in the Primeira Liga, for F.C. Paços de Ferreira, S.C. Salgueiros (three spells), C.F. Os Belenenses, Boavista FC, C.S. Marítimo and S.C. Farense. He was one of several Portuguese imports at Spanish club UD Salamanca as they competed in La Liga in the late 1990s, with Pauleta among his compatriot colleagues.

Tulipa earned 31 caps for Portugal up to under-21 level and scored four goals, being part of the under-20 squad that won the 1991 FIFA World Youth Championship on home soil. He played three times for the senior side, all in friendlies, starting on 29 January 1995 when he came on as a 70th-minute substitute for Rui Bento in a 1–0 victory over Denmark for the SkyDome Cup.

Coaching career
Tulipa began working as a manager at Segunda Liga side A.D. Ovarense in the second half of the 2005–06 season, suffering relegation. After a year in the third division with G.D. Ribeirão, he signed a one-year deal with G.D. Estoril Praia in May 2007.

After finishing in seventh in the second tier, Tulipa was given another year in charge in July 2008. However, on 25 September he left abruptly for C.D. Trofense, replacing Toni Conceição at a team in last place in their debut campaign in the top flight but not being able to move them into a higher position.

Tulipa was then out of work until March 2010, when he was appointed at second-division G.D. Chaves following the resignation of Nuno Pinto. In April, his side won 3–1 on aggregate after extra time in the semi-finals of the Taça de Portugal against Associação Naval 1º de Maio to reach the final for the first time, losing the decisive match 2–1 to FC Porto on 16 May; the domestic campaign ended with descent, however.

In February 2011, Tulipa returned to the second tier in charge of S.C. Covilhã initially until 30 June, only resigning the following year in April with the team in last place. In 2015, he spent a few weeks back at Ribeirão, who were eventually relegated from the third league.

Tulipa became manager of Porto's under-19s, the reigning champions of the UEFA Youth League, on 5 July 2019. Two years later, he was appointed at Marítimo's under-23 side.

On 3 October 2022, Tulipa signed with F.C. Vizela in the same capacity. In December, he replaced the dismissed Álvaro Pacheco at the first team on an interim basis.

References

External links

1972 births
Living people
Sportspeople from Vila Nova de Gaia
Portuguese footballers
Association football midfielders
Primeira Liga players
Liga Portugal 2 players
Segunda Divisão players
Rio Ave F.C. players
F.C. Paços de Ferreira players
S.C. Salgueiros players
C.F. Os Belenenses players
Boavista F.C. players
C.S. Marítimo players
S.C. Farense players
F.C. Felgueiras players
La Liga players
Segunda División players
UD Salamanca players
CD Badajoz players
Portugal youth international footballers
Portugal under-21 international footballers
Portugal international footballers
Portuguese expatriate footballers
Expatriate footballers in Spain
Portuguese expatriate sportspeople in Spain
Portuguese football managers
Primeira Liga managers
Liga Portugal 2 managers
G.D. Estoril Praia managers
C.D. Trofense managers
G.D. Chaves managers
S.C. Covilhã managers
F.C. Vizela managers